The 1932 Finnish Grand Prix was a Grand Prix motor race held at Eläintarharata on 8 May 1932. It was the first Grand Prix ever held in Finland.

Classification

References 

Finnish Grand Prix
Grand Prix
Finnish Grand Prix